Fort Liard  (Slavey language: Echaot'l Koe "people from the land of the giants" or Acho Dene Kue) is a hamlet in the Dehcho Region of the Northwest Territories, Canada. It became accessible by road in 1984 with the completion of the Liard Highway (Northwest Territories Highway 7 and British Columbia Highway 77).

The Hamlet of Fort Liard is served by two general merchandise stores: The General Store and The North West Company store. The K-12 community school, "Echo Dene School", has a student population of about 150. It also has a community health centre with four nurses, a Royal Canadian Mounted Police detachment with four members, and a recreation centre, including a swimming pool, skating rink, youth centre and multi-court. There is a fuel centre that sells gasoline, diesel fuel, propane, emergency survival kits and convenience items. There is also a traditional craft store which sells locally made craft items.

Demographics 

In the 2016 Census the majority of the population, 445 people out of a total of 500, were Indigenous, either First Nations or Métis.

First Nations
The Dene of the community are represented by the Acho Dene Koe Band and the Métis by Fort Liard Metis Local 67. Both groups belong to the Deh Cho First Nations Tribal Council.

Gallery

Climate
Fort Liard has a borderline subarctic climate (Köppen climate classification Dfc), just short of a humid continental climate (Köppen climate classification Dfb), characterized by extreme variation of temperatures between seasons. Temperatures can be warm in the summer, and cold in the winter.

See also
 List of municipalities in the Northwest Territories
Fort Liard Airport

References

External links
 Fort Liard Web Site

Communities in the Dehcho Region
Dene communities
Hudson's Bay Company forts
Hamlets in the Northwest Territories